Pine Forest High School is a high school in Pensacola, Florida. It was opened in 1975,  with the first day of class being 10 November '75.

Pine Forest High is located on Longleaf Drive in a cluster of education buildings.

Athletics 
Pine Forest won the USA Today High School Football National Championship in 1988 (and the Class 5A state championship) after compiling a 13-0 record, becoming the first Florida team to win the award The Eagles also won the 5A state championship in 1987 and the 4A state championship in 2000. Three former Eagles now play in the NFL: Mike Johnson of the Atlanta Falcons, George Selvie of the Dallas Cowboys, and Alfred Morris formerly a Redskin and a Cowboy currently.

Pine Forest Women's Track and Field team won back to back Florida 3A State Championships in 2010 and 2011.

The mascot is the eagle, and the colors are red, white, and blue. The fight song is Hoorah for Eagles a rendition of Hooray for Auburn!!
The original fight song was a version of Ghost Riders.

Fall sports 
 Cross Country
 Football
 Golf
 Swimming
 Volleyball
 Soccer

Winter sports 
 Men's Basketball
 Women's Basketball
 Women's Weightlifting
 Cheerleading

Spring sports 
 Baseball
 Softball
 Tennis
 Men's Track
 Women's Track
 Men's Weightlifting

Notable alumni
 Daniel Alvarez, former professional soccer midfielder
 Chuck Clanton, former NFL defensive back
 Martin Emerson, current cornerback for the Cleveland Browns
 Dan Fike, former NFL offensive lineman
 Paul Jackson, lead guitar, rhythm guitar, backing vocals Blackberry Smoke (2000–present)
 Mike Johnson, offensive guard for the Atlanta Falcons
 Donald (Eugene) Kirkland, lieutenant general in the U.S. Air Force
 Alfred Morris, running back for the Washington Redskins
 Loucheiz Purifoy, cornerback for the University of Florida
 George Selvie, defensive end for the New York Giants
 Seante Williams, former NFL defensive end

See also

Escambia County School District

References

External links 
 

Educational institutions established in 1975
Escambia County School District
High schools in Escambia County, Florida
Public high schools in Florida
1975 establishments in Florida